Francis Joseph Hall (1857–1932) was an American Episcopal theologian and priest in the Anglo-Catholic tradition. Hall was the one of the first to attempt an Anglican systematic theology.

Early life and education
Hall was born on December 24, 1857, in Ashtabula, Ohio, as the son of Joseph  and Juliet E. Giswold Hall and grandson of John Hall (1788–1869), an early missionary priest in Ohio and later rector of St. Peter's Church, Ashtabula. He was educated in the local schools in Ashtabula until 1866, when he and his parents moved to Chicago, Illinois. His grandfather, with his parents' permission, dedicated his life to the church at his birth. Upon completion of his education in the Chicago public schools, Hall entered Racine College in Racine, Wisconsin, where he graduated with a Bachelor of Arts degree in 1882 and a Master of Arts degree in 1885. Graduating as a candidate for holy orders, he went on to study at the General Theological Seminary in New York City and, after two years transferred to the Western Theological Seminary in Chicago (now Seabury-Western Theological Seminary).

Career
Ordained a deacon  on July 1, 1885, he was advanced to the priesthood  on October 11, 1886, by William E. McLaren, Bishop of Chicago. After his diaconal ordination, he began teaching at Western Theological Seminary and in 1905 was appointed to a professorship of dogmatic theology. He was also registrar of the Diocese of Chicago from 1894 to 1913 and was church counsel in the trial of Algernon Sidney Crapsey in 1906. In 1913, General Theological Seminary elected him as its professor of dogmatic theology, a position he retained until his retirement in 1928. As a child he contracted scarlet fever, which handicapped him by partial deafness. In a midlife nervous breakdown, his deafness became total, but he continued to train more than a generation of future Episcopal priests and bishops.

In 1910 and in 1927, he was a delegate to the World Conferences on "Faith and Order". In 1923, he delivered an important paper at the Anglo-Catholic Conference in the interest of reunion, entitled "The Future of the Church".

Kenyon College awarded him an  Doctor of Divinity degree in 1898 and the General Theological Seminary awarded him an honorary Doctor of Sacred Theology degree.

Summer ministry
In June 1902, Hall became one of the pioneer summer residents in Onekama, Michigan, on Portage Lake.  He immediately purchased property and built a summer home that was completed during his first summer. Obtaining the permission of George D. Gillespie, the first Bishop of Western Michigan, Hall began to celebrate Holy Communion in the study of his summer home to a small group of friends and neighbors.  In 1911, he purchased a lakefront lot and arranged for the construction of a chapel to his own design, which was dedicated on August 11, 1912, as the Chapel of St. John-by-the-Lake. Hall remained as priest-in-charge until October 1930, when he resigned no longer able to make the summer trip to Michigan.

The altar of the chapel is dedicated to Hall's memory. He died in Baldwinsville, New York, on March 12, 1932.

Published works
 
 
 
 
 
 
 
 
 
 
 
 
 
 
 
 
 
 
 
 
 
 Moral Theology. With Hallock, Frank H. New York: Longmans, Green and Co. 1924. . .

References

Footnotes

Bibliography

Further reading

 
 
 
 
 
 

1857 births
1932 deaths
19th-century American Episcopal priests
20th-century American Episcopal priests
20th-century American theologians
Academics from New York (state)
Academics from Ohio
American Anglo-Catholics
American Episcopal theologians
Anglo-Catholic clergy
Anglo-Catholic theologians
General Theological Seminary faculty
People from Ashtabula, Ohio
Racine College alumni
Religious leaders from New York (state)
Religious leaders from Ohio
Systematic theologians
19th-century Anglican theologians
20th-century Anglican theologians